Certified Community Association Manager (CCAM) is a professional certification in property management earned through the Minnesota Multi-Housing Association (MHA) or the California Association of Community Managers (CACM).  Those certified as a CCAM are deemed by the association to have obtained a certain level of professional competence in the management and administration of common interest communities or developments (also called CIDs), which are generally townhome, condominium or homeowner associations or cooperatives.

External links
 Minnesota Multi-Housing Website
 California Association of Community Managers Website

Property management
Professional titles and certifications